1001° Centigrades, alternative title 2, is the second album by French rock band Magma, released on 5 October 1971. Future reissues use both titles as 2: 1001° Centigrades.

The first track, "Rïah Sahïltaahk", was later re-recorded as a full-length studio album, Rïah Sahïltaahk, in 2014, as Christian Vander did not consider himself satisfied with the arrangement on this album.

Background
For this album,

Track listing

Legacy
On 1001° Centigrades the "zeuhl" sound that later came to define Magma develops, but it lacks the operatic female vocals and primal driving rhythm of the following album, Mëkanïk Dëstruktïẁ Kömmandöh.

Between the release of this album and MDK, a number of band members left the band due to disagreements on its future sound. Two (saxophonist Yochk'o "Jeff" Seffer and keyboardist François Cahen) left to form Zao, a band which follows in the footsteps of Magma's first two releases.

Musicians 
 Klaus Blasquiz – vocals, percussion
 Teddy Lasry – clarinet, saxophone, flute, voice
 Yochk'o "Jeff" Seffer – saxophone, bass clarinet
 Louis Toesca – trumpet
 François Cahen – acoustic & electric pianos
 Francis Moze – bass
 Christian Vander – vocals, drums, percussion

Production
 Produced by Roland Hilda
 Engineered by Dominique Blanc-Francard
 Louis Sarkissian – manager

References

1971 albums
Jazz fusion albums by French artists
Magma (band) albums
Philips Records albums